Przepis na życie (English Recipe For Life) is a Polish Comedy drama television series produced by Akson Studio for the TVN network. The series was created and written by Polish actress Agnieszka Pilaszewska. It premiered on 6 March 2011 at 21:25 after X Factor.

Series 1 (Spring 2011)

Series 2 (Fall 2011)

Series 3 (Spring 2012)

References 

Lists of comedy-drama television series episodes
Lists of Polish television series episodes